The arrowback tree snake (Boiga gocool)  is a species of rear-fanged colubrid found in Bhutan, Bangladesh and India (Assam, Sikkim, Arunachal Pradesh (Chessa - Papum Pare district).

References

 Whitaker, Romulus and Ashok Captain 2004 Snakes of India. Draco Books, 500 pp.
 Boulenger, George A. 1890 The Fauna of British India, Including Ceylon and Burma. Reptilia and Batrachia. Taylor & Francis, London, xviii, 541 pp.
 Gray. J. E. 1835 Illustrations of Indian Zoology, chiefly selected from the collection of Major - General Hardwicke. Vol. 2. London (1833–1834): 263 pp., 95 plates

gocool
Reptiles described in 1835
Taxa named by John Edward Gray
Reptiles of India
Reptiles of Bangladesh
Reptiles of Bhutan